Greenstead Green is a village in the civil parish of Greenstead Green and Halstead Rural, near the town of Halstead in the Braintree district, in the English county of Essex.

Other nearby settlements include Burton's Green, Earls Colne, Plaistow Green and Tumbler's Green.

References 

A-Z Essex, 2010 edition. p. 15.

Villages in Essex
Braintree District